Gladys Gordon (aka G.G. Pendarves and Gladys Gordon Trenery) was a British novelist and screenwriter active during Hollywood's silent era. On all of her screenplays, she collaborated with fellow writer Ada McQuillan. She was known for her short stories on the occult published in pulp magazine Weird Tales.

Selected filmography 

 The Girl He Didn't Buy (1928)
 Golden Shackles (1928)
 Wilful Youth (1927)
 Web of Fate (1927)

Selected Bibliography

Short Fiction 

 The Return (1924)
 The Devil's Graveyard (1924)
 The Power of the Dog (1927)
 The Lord of the Tarn (1927)
 The Eighth Green Man (1928)
 The Ruler of Zem-Zem (1928)
 The Doomed Treveans (1928)
 The Laughing Thing (1929)
 The Grave at Goonhilly (1930)
 The Footprint (1930)
 The Black Camel (1930)
 The Veiled Leopard (1930)
 Thirty Pieces of Silver (1931)
 The Secret Trail (1931)
 El Hamel, the Lost One (1932)
 The Djinnee of El Sheyb (1932)
 From the Dark Halls of Hell (1932)
 The Altar of Melek Taos (1932)
 Abd Dhulma, Lord of Fire (1933) 
 Passport to the Desert (1934) 
 Werewolf of the Sahara (1936) 
 The Dark Star (1937) 
 The Whistling Corpse (1937) 
 Thing of Darkness (1937) 
 The Black Monk (1938) 
 The Sin-Eater (1938) 
 The Withered Heart (1939)

References 

British screenwriters
British writers
British women screenwriters